Aldo Righi (born 29 July 1947) is a retired Italian pole vaulter who won a bronze medal at the 1969 European Athletics Championships.

References

External links
 

1947 births
Living people
Italian male pole vaulters
European Athletics Championships medalists